USS Papaya (AN-49/YN-68) was an  which served with the U.S. Navy in the South Pacific Ocean theatre of operations during World War II.  Her career was without major incident, and she returned home after the war bearing two battle stars to her credit.

Launched in Stockton, California
Papaya (YN–68) was laid down by the Pollock-Stockton Shipbuilding Company, Stockton, California, 2 November 1942; launched 23 May 1943; sponsored by Mrs. L. L. Lindley; commissioned 1 December 1943. She was reclassified AN–49 on 20 January 1944.

World War II service

Pacific Ocean operations
Following shakedown, Papaya joined ServRon 10 for duty in the Pacific Ocean and proceeded via Pearl Harbor to the Marshall Islands where she arrived 8 March 1944. After laying moorings and channel buoys and installing anti-torpedo nets in the Marshalls group, she departed for the Mariana Islands, arriving Saipan 1 August. She assisted in net operations while fighting on the beach was still in process, helping capture both Saipan and Tinian.

End-of-war operations
After returning to Long Beach, California, 18 December for overhaul and alterations, she deployed to the Western Pacific again 22 May 1945, this time to Ulithi, Caroline Islands, for important net operations.

Following the surrender of Japan, Papaya actively participated in the surrender and occupation of Yap and undertook several search missions to islands and atolls east of Ulithi capturing 26 Japanese soldiers. She departed 17 October for the United States via Saipan and Pearl Harbor and arrived San Diego, California, 26 November.

Post-war decommissioning
Surplus to the Navy’s needs after World War II, Papaya decommissioned at Terminal Island, California, 31 January 1946 and was stricken from the Naval Register 25 February.

Honors and awards 
Papaya received two battle stars for service in World War II.

References
  
 NavSource Online: Service Ship Photo Archive - YN-68 / AN-49 Papaya

 

Ailanthus-class net laying ships of the United States Navy
Ships built in Stockton, California
1943 ships
World War II net laying ships of the United States